Brothers is an upcoming Czech action drama film directed by Tomáš Mašín. It is based on a controversial story of Josef and Ctirad Mašín.

Cast
Oskar Hes as Josef Mašín
Jan Nedbal as Ctirad Mašín
Tatiana Dyková as Zdena Mašínová
Matěj Hádek as Zbyněk Roušar
Adam Ernest as Milan Paumer
Fritz Fenne as Major Vopo
Matyáš Řezníček
Tony Mašek

Production
The film is directed by Tomáš Mašín a distant relative of Mašín brothers. He started preparations of the film in 2010. Mašín had problem to find finances but in 2019 it gained foundation 15 million CZK from Czech film fund but shooting was stalled due to COVID-19 pandemic in the Czech Republic. The film also gained 1.5 million CZK on crowdfunding site Hithit.

During May 2022 filmmakers were choosing locations for filming, worked on costumes and were casting supporting roles. Oskar Hes and Jan Nedbal were chosen for main roles. Shooting started in early August 2022. Shooting concluded on 6 December 2022.

References

External links
 
 Brothers at CSFD.cz 

2023 films
2023 action drama films
Czech action drama films
Czech historical drama films
2020s Czech-language films
2020s historical drama films
Czech historical action films
Czech films based on actual events